Eagle Eye is a 2008 American film.

Eagle Eye or eagle eye may also refer to:

Arts, media and entertainment
 Eagle Eye Mysteries, a 1993 series of educational computer games
 "Eagle Eye", a song by Tarja Turunen from The Brightest Void
 The Eagle's Eye, 1918 serial film
 Eagle Eye (Transformers), a character in the Transformers franchise

Newspapers
 Jackson Eagle Eye, a former African American newspaper from Mississippi, US
 The Eagle Eye, the newspaper of Lock Haven University of Pennsylvania, US

Organizations
 Eagle Eye Networks, an American video surveillance provider
 Eagle Eye Technologies, now SkyBitz, an American asset tracking service company

People
 Eagle-Eye Cherry (born 1968), American-Swedish musician
 Mark Allen (snooker player) (born 1986), Northern Irish snooker player

Other uses
 Eagle eye, the visual organ of the eagle
 Bell Eagle Eye, an American unmanned aerial vehicle
 Operation Eagle Eye (disambiguation)

See also 
 Eye of the Eagle (disambiguation)
 Eagle Vision (disambiguation)